Kannoth Muraleedharan (born 14 May 1957) is an Indian National Congress (INC) politician from Kerala, the son of eminent congress leader K. Karunakaran. He was elected as member of the Lok Sabha thrice (in 1989, 1991, and 1999) from the Kozhikode constituency, subsequently leaving the party in 2005. For a while he had joined NCP of Sharad Pawar. Then he rejoined Congress. He was elected as the Chairman of KPCC Campaign committee in September 2018. He entered 17th Lok Sabha by winning from the Vatakara in 2019 general elections.

Personal life
Muraleedharan was born to K. Karunakaran and Kalyanikutty Amma in Thrissur, Kerala on 14 May 1957. His younger sister, Padmaja Venugopal, is an extant politician. Their family hails from Chirakkal, Kannur. After pursuing Bachelor of Arts from Mar Ivanios College, Thiruvananthapuram, he qualified in law from The Kerala Law Academy Law College, Thiruvananthapuram.

Muraleedharan is married to Jyothi. They have two sons, Arun Narayanan and Sabari Nath.

Political career
Muraleedharan started his political career within the Congress party as a Seva Dal worker. Thereafter, he held the posts of District chairman and State Chief of Kerala Seva Dal. He was elected as Member of Parliament from the Calicut (Kozhikode) constituency in the General Elections of 1989 by defeating veteran Communist Party of India (Marxist) leader E. K. Imbichi Bava and winning re-election in 1991 by defeating Janata Dal leader M. P. Veerendra Kumar. In the 1996 general election, he lost his seat to  M. P. Veerendra Kumar and subsequently failed in Thrissur Loksabha seat in his comeback attempt in the 1998 election, before regaining Kozhikode seat by defeating Janata Dal national leader and former Union Minister C. M. Ibrahim in 1999. Thereafter, he held the roles of General secretary, Vice-President of Kerala Congress Committee (KPCC) and became the President of KPCC during 2001–2004.

In February 2004, Muraleedharan was appointed Minister of Power in the A. K. Antony Ministry, though he was not a member of the Kerala Legislative Assembly. He was required to win a seat within six months to continue as the minister but lost in by-election from Wadakkancherry. Subsequently, he resigned in May that year. He is the only state Minister who was never MLA and never faced the legislative assembly.

In 2005, when the Karunakaran faction of the Indian National Congress party had differences with the party leadership and the United Democratic Front (UDF), some members of the party quit and formed another party named Democratic Indira Congress (Karunakaran) (DIC(K)). They allied with the Left Democratic Front (LDF) for the local panchayat elections of 2005 and had some success.

However, for the Kerala Assembly elections of 2006, DIC(K) made a pact with UDF as LDF declined to make any electoral arrangements with DIC(K).  DIC(K) contested in 17 constituencies but managed to get elected only from one seat mostly because of grassroots level cross-voting by Congress. Muralidharan lost the election in Koduvally constituency to P.T.A. Rahim.

With the future of the DIC(K) party untenable, some party members of the DIC(K) returned to the Congress party whilst others, including Karunakaran and Muraleedharan, decided instead to join the Nationalist Congress Party (NCP).

Later, Karunakaran rejoined the Congress party, while his son Muraleedharan opted to stay with the NCP, decrying his father's "betrayal". Muraleedharan contested the 2009 Lok Sabha polls from the Wayanad constituency under the NCP ticket, but came only in third place, behind the Congress party and the CPI.

In August 2009, he was expelled from the NCP and sacked as state chief of the party, as he openly expressed his desire to rejoin the Congress party. He was subsequently refused re-entry into the Congress party, the party leadership stating that the disparaging comments he had made about the party leadership whilst in opposition were too big a barrier to his re-joining. Muraleedharan pledged that he would "wait for any length of time" for the party to change its mind and readmit him, while his father Karunakaran stated that he would take up the matter with the national leadership of the Congress party, if necessary. He was readmitted to the Congress party in February 2011, and was given a ticket to contest the Assembly election from the Vattiyurkavu Assembly constituency (former Thiruvananthapuram North Constituency). Subsequently, he won his first assembly election after he defeated ruling Communist Party of India-Marxist (CPI-M) supported independent candidate Cherian Philip by a margin of over 16,167 votes on 14 May 2011. He was re-elected for the second time in 2016 defeating Kummanam Rajasekharan of Bharatiya Janata Party by a margin of 7622 votes.

In Indian general election 2019 he has been elected from Vatakara with a tremendous margin by defeating P. Jayarajan of Communist Party of India (Marxist) by a margin of 84663 votes. He was the official candidate of UDF in Nemom Constituency for 2021 Assembly Elections, but lost against LDF candidate, V Sivankutty.

Positions held
 1989 – Member of Parliament from Kozhikode – by defeating Communist Party of India (Marxist) leader E. K. Imbichi Bava
 1991 – Member of Parliament from Kozhikode – by defeating Janata Dal leader M.P. Veerendra Kumar
 1999 – Member of Parliament from Kozhikode – by defeating Janata Dal leader M.P. Veerendra Kumar
 2011 – Member of Legislative Assembly from Vattiyoorkavu – by defeating left independent leader Cherian Philip
 2016 – Member of Legislative Assembly from Vattiyoorkavu – by defeating Bharatiya Janata Party leader Kummanam Rajasekharan
 2019 – Member of Parliament from Vatakara – by defeating Communist Party of India (Marxist) leader P. Jayarajan  by a margin of 84663 votes and resigned from Kerala Legislative Assembly.

References

Politicians from Thrissur
Malayali politicians
1957 births
Living people
People from Kozhikode district
Indian National Congress politicians from Kerala
India MPs 1989–1991
Nationalist Congress Party politicians from Kerala
India MPs 1991–1996
India MPs 1999–2004
Lok Sabha members from Kerala
Kerala MLAs 2011–2016
Kerala MLAs 2016–2021
India MPs 2019–present